Rayachoti revenue division is an administrative division in the Annamayya district of the Indian state of Andhra Pradesh. It is one of the three revenue divisions in the district and comprises ten mandals. It was formed on 4 April 2022 along with the newly formed Annamayya district.

Administration 
The revenue division comprises ten mandals: Chinnamandyam, Galiveedu, Gurramkonda, K. V. Palle, Kalakada, Lakkireddypalli, Piler, Rayachoti, Sambepalli, Ramapuram.

References 

2022 establishments in Andhra Pradesh
Revenue divisions in Annamayya district